The Olgopol uezd was one of the uezds (uyezds or subdivisions) of the Podolia Governorate of the Russian Empire. It was situated in the southeastern part of the governorate. Its administrative centre was Olhopil (Olgopol).

Demographics
At the time of the Russian Empire Census of 1897, Olgopolsky Uyezd had a population of 284,253. Of these, 81.6% spoke Ukrainian, 11.5% Yiddish, 2.9% Moldovan or Romanian, 2.2% Russian, 1.5% Polish and 0.2% German as their native language.

References

 
Uezds of Podolia Governorate